The 1984–85 Illinois Fighting Illini men's basketball team represented the University of Illiniois.

Regular season
The Illini started out the 1984-85 season ranked No. 1 nationally by Basketball Times in its preseason poll. Illinois made a return trip to the NCAA tournament where the Illini advanced to the Sweet 16.

Roster

Source

Schedule
												
Source																
												

|-
!colspan=12 style="background:#DF4E38; color:white;"| Non-Conference regular season
				
	

|-
!colspan=9 style="background:#DF4E38; color:#FFFFFF;"|Big Ten regular season	

|-
!colspan=9 style="text-align: center; background:#DF4E38"|NCAA Tournament

|-

Player stats

Awards and honors
 Bruce Douglas
Big Ten Defensive Player of the Year
Fighting Illini All-Century team (2005)
Ken Norman
Fighting Illini All-Century team (2005)
Doug Altenberger
Team Most Valuable Player

Team players drafted into the NBA

Rankings

References

Illinois Fighting Illini
Illinois Fighting Illini men's basketball seasons
Illinois
Illinois Fight
Illinois Fight